Albertville is an unincorporated community located in the town of Howard, Chippewa County, Wisconsin, United States. The community was named after Albert Halvorsen, a barber and shopkeeper in Eau Claire, Wisconsin.

Notes

Unincorporated communities in Chippewa County, Wisconsin
Unincorporated communities in Wisconsin